Townview (previously written as Town View) is a suburb of Mount Isa in the City of Mount Isa, Queensland, Australia.

Geography 
The Leichhardt River flows north-south through the town of Mount Isa, dividing the suburbs of the town into "mineside" (west of the Leichhardt River) and "townside" (east of the Leichhardt River). Townview is a "townside" suburb.

Townview is bounded to the north by the Barkly Highway.

History 
The spelling of Townview was standardised in 2003 at the request of the Mount Isa City Council.

Townview State School opened on 25 January 1965.

Education 

Townview State School is a government primary (Prep-6) school for boys and girls at 64-72 Clarke Street.  In 2016, the school had an enrolment of 281 students (170 of whom identified as Indigenous Australians) with 25 teachers (24 full-time equivalent) and 18 non-teaching staff (13 full-time equivalent). In 2018, the school had an enrolment of 233 students (161 of whom identified as Indigenous Australians) with 24 teachers (22 full-time equivalent) and 20 non-teaching staff (15 full-time equivalent).

There are no secondary schools in Townview.  The nearest government secondary school is Spinifex State College which has its junior campus in Parkside to the south-west and its senior campus in neighbouring Pioneer to the north.

Amenities 
There are a number of parks in the area:

 Enid Street Park
 Kookaburra Street Park

 Mcnamara Street Park

References

Further reading

External links 

 

City of Mount Isa